Marinilactibacillus psychrotolerans is a Gram-positive, mesophilic, alkaliphilic, slightly halophilic, highly halotolerant, non-spore-forming and motile bacterium from the genus Marinilactibacillus which has been isolated from a sponge from the Oura beach.

References

Lactobacillales
Bacteria described in 2003